Kids Again may refer to:
"Kids Again" (Example song), 2014
"Kids Again" (Sam Smith song), 2021
"Kids Again", a 2007 song by Chris Rice from the album What a Heart Is Beating For